DJ Abass (born Abass Abayomi Tijani,) is a media & entertainment consultant, broadcaster, DJ and compere based in the United Kingdom. He is the CEO of the entertainment and media management outfit, DJAMEDIA. He is also well known in the Nigerian and African community in the United Kingdom for presenting and co-producing the television show Intro and the Big Nigerian Independence Intro Jam series.

Background
DJ Abass was born in London to Kolawole Rasak Tijani and Deborah Kojusola Tijani, a nurse and midwife. He then moved to Nigeria with his younger brother where he was educated at Mate Nursery and Primary School, Lagos, Baptist Academy, Obanikoro, Lagos and later Baptist High School Port-Harcourt. He then went on to the University of Ado-Ekiti (formerly Ondo State University, now Adekunle Ajasin University) where he obtained a degree in Political Science. DJ Abass is the first of four children and also has two older half brothers.

Early career
In 2000, DJ Abass was a founding member of the Nigerian DJs Association UK chapter and helped organise a series of concerts showcasing the very best of Nigerian DJs in the UK.

In 2002, moved into artiste management when he met trio of Soji Adebayo, Michael Oloyede and Michael Enebeli (a.k.a. Don Jazzy) performing as Solek Crew at a regular weekly night spot. He subsequently started to informally manage the group which went on to be one of the hottest indigenous Nigerian acts in the UK. The band featured as headline act at many events notably The BIG Nigerian Independence Intro Jam and The Nigerian Corner at the Notting Hill Carnival. DJ Abass also met and mentored the artiste KAS in this period and took him along on a musical trip to Nigeria in 2006.

Television
In 2003, DJ Abass presented and co-produced a live music show on television on the hit music program Intro Live with Dj Abass. The program exclusively showcased Nigerian and African music acts through live interviews and music video premieres. Intro Live was a two-hour TV show and the brainchild of his good friend Ayo Shonaiya. It aired on Ben TV (and later OBE TV) and was seen all over Europe and in some parts of North Africa. Guests on the show include stars like King Sunny Adé, Chaka Demus & Pliers, D'banj, Nneka, Eldee, 2Face Idibia, P-Square, JJC, Erykah Badu, George Clinton, Brenda Fassie, Ying Yang Twins, Wasiu Ayinde Marshall, Lady Saw, Sir Shina Peters, Werason, Ebenezer Obey, and many more.

Intro the TV show then had successful spin-offs in the Intro concert series which included The BIG Nigerian Independence Intro Jam, The Intro Summer Jam and The Intro Christmas Jam. The Nigerian pop star D'banj's debut solo performance was at the 2004 edition of the BIG Independence Intro Jam and days after was guest in his first ever televised interview on Intro with DJ Abass.

Media and entertainment consultancy
DJ Abass is the CEO of DJAMEDIA. This outfit is a dedicated media and entertainment consultancy firm specialising in first class entertainment events management and full media campaigns to targeted demographics within the Nigerian and African communities in the UK. . It has been responsible for some of the biggest and most prestigious entertainment events within the African social network and notable among these are first class Nollywood movie premieres. DJAMEDIA is the leading organiser of Nigerian and Nollywood movie premieres in the United Kingdom. Notable among such premieres it has produced and co-produced are Fifty, When Love Happens, The First Lady, The Figurine, The Mirror Boy (Mirror Boy), Anchor Baby, Bursting Out, Family on Fire, and Kiss & Tell. Other DJAMEDIA projects include football matches in the UK involving the Super Eagles, concerts, comedy shows (Crack Ya Ribs UK) and regular night club events.

Awards
Smade Recognition Award 2016 – 'Outstanding Contribution to UK Afrobeats'
Afrobeats Music Awards 2015 – 'Outstanding contribution to Afrobeats'
African Film Awards 2014 – 'Entertainment Promoter of the Year'
Nelawards Awards 2014 – 'Leadership & Mentoring in the Entertainment Industry'
Beffta Awards 2011 – 'Entertainment Icon of the Year'
The Diamond Special Recognition Awards UK 2011 – "Entertainment Personality of the Year'
Africa Music Awards 2008- 'Club DJ of the Year'

Nigerian Music Awards UK 2006 – 'Entertainment Journalist of the Year'
AEPEG Awards 2006 – 'Outstanding Entertainment Personality of the Year'
Academy of Creative Arts in Nigeria (ACAN) 2006 – Inducted as Honorary Member

Other projects
UK Nollywood Movie Premieres Organiser
Wazobia Lounge at Africa Olympics Village London, 2012. Media and Entertainment co-ordinator.
Super Eagles vs Black Stars of Ghana International Friendly in London October 2011. Media Consultant.
Kanu Heart Foundation UK Charity Gala 2006. Official DJ
Intro Independence Tou', Napoli Italy, London UK and Dublin Ireland 2005. Co-Producer.
Intro Afro-Hip Hop Jam, Atlanta US 2005. Official DJ
Big Nigerian Independence Intro Jam & Intro Summer Jam series, London UK 2003 – 2005. Co-Producer with Ayo Shonaiya.
Nigeria Corner Notting Hill Carnival London UK 1986–Present. Founding participant of the famous Nigerian Corner at the annual Notting Hill Carnival in London. Co-organiser and Official DJ from 1997 at the Cambridge Gardens site (except for 2007 & 2008 when site was closed). Dj Abass is part of the team that resurrected the Nigeria Corner at the new site on Adela Road from 2009 till date.

Personal life
DJ Abass is married to Adenike and has two children – Toby and Tomi. He is a fan of Arsenal F.C., a team his father also supported.

See also 
List of Nigerian DJs

References

1968 births
Living people
DJs from London
Adekunle Ajasin University alumni
British emigrants to Nigeria